Tokyo's 4th district is a single-member constituency of the House of Representatives, the lower house of the national Diet of Japan.

It was won by the Liberal Democratic Party in the 2017 Japanese general election.

References 

1994 establishments in Japan
Constituencies established in 1994
Districts of the House of Representatives (Japan)
Politics of Tokyo